The 1985 season was the Chicago Bears' 66th in the National Football League (NFL) and their fourth under head coach Mike Ditka.

The Bears entered 1985 looking to improve on their 10–6 record from 1984 and advance further than the NFC Championship Game, where they lost to the 15–1 San Francisco 49ers. Not only did the Bears improve on that record, but they also put together one of the greatest seasons in NFL history.

The Bears won their first twelve games of the season before losing to the Miami Dolphins on Monday Night Football. The loss to the Dolphins would be the only loss the Bears would suffer that season, as they finished with a 15–1 record. This matched the 49ers' mark from the year before and tied the then-record for most wins in a regular season; the record would be reached twice more in 1998 (Minnesota Vikings) and 2004 (Pittsburgh Steelers) before the New England Patriots ended the 2007 NFL season with a 16–0 regular season record. 

The Bears' defense was ranked first in the league and only allowed 198 total points (an average of 12.4 points per game). The Bears won the NFC Central Division by seven games over the second-place Green Bay Packers and earned the NFC's top seed and home-field advantage throughout the playoffs at Soldier Field. In their two playoff games against the New York Giants and Los Angeles Rams, the Bears outscored their opponents 45–0 and became the first team to record back-to-back playoff shutouts. 

Then, in Super Bowl XX at the Louisiana Superdome against the New England Patriots, the Bears set several more records. First, their 46 points broke the previous record of 38 that had been scored by the Los Angeles Raiders in Super Bowl XVIII and again by the 49ers in Super Bowl XIX. Their 36-point margin of victory also topped the 29-point margin of victory that the Raiders recorded over the Washington Redskins in Super Bowl XVIII. Both of those records would stand until Super Bowl XXIV in New Orleans four years later, when the 49ers defeated the Denver Broncos by 45 points, 55–10. 

It was the Bears' first NFL Championship title since 1963 and their most recent championship. 

The 1985 Chicago Bears are one of the few teams to consistently challenge the undefeated 1972 Miami Dolphins for the unofficial title of the greatest NFL team of all time. In 2007, the 1985 Bears were ranked as the second greatest Super Bowl championship team on the NFL Network's documentary series America's Game: The Super Bowl Champions, ranking behind only the 1972 Dolphins. They also ranked #2 behind only the Dolphins on the 100 greatest teams of all time presented by the NFL on its 100th anniversary. Other sources rate the 1985 Chicago Bears as the greatest NFL team ever.

The defense led the league in points allowed (198), yards allowed (4,135) and takeaways (54), a feat that wouldn't be accomplished again until the 2013 Seattle Seahawks defense.

Offseason

Transactions

Signings
After the draft, the Bears signed 3 undrafted free agents, quarterback Mike Tomczak from Ohio State, along with defensive back Ken Taylor and receiver Keith Ortego of Oregon State and McNeese State, respectively.

Trades
In a trade with the San Diego Chargers, the Bears acquired linebacker Cliff Thrift and punter Maury Buford by trading away their 12th round draft picks from 1985 and 1986, respectively.

Contractual issues
During training camp, seven players, including Mike Singletary, Steve McMichael, Keith Van Horne and rookie William Perry, were either unsigned or holding out due to their contracts. Perry, McMichael and Van Horne eventually reported to training camp. Perry held out until August 5, when he signed a four-year, $1.35 million contract. However, after an unimpressive showing at training camp, defensive coordinator Buddy Ryan tabbed Perry as a "wasted draft-pick". Before the team's season opening game against the Tampa Bay Buccaneers, players Al Harris, Todd Bell and Richard Dent requested to be traded. Dent and the Bears had been attempting to work out a contract extension, as his contract ran through the 1985 season, and paid him $90,000. Bell played for $77,000 the year before, and made the 1985 Pro Bowl roster, but asked for $950,000 annually, which would have made him the highest-paid player on the team. Bell and Harris would eventually hold out for the season.

1985 NFL Draft

Undrafted free agents

Preseason

Regular season

Schedule

Game summaries

Regular season

Week 1: vs. Buccaneers

In the season opener against the Bucs, the Bears defense seemed lost for much of the first half of the game by allowing 28 points, and trailed 28–17 at halftime, but the offense was able to lead the Bears to a victory after Jim McMahon scored 3 touchdowns, with Matt Suhey scoring on another. Leslie Frazier was also able to give the Bears defense their first highlight of the season by returning a Steve DeBerg interception 29 yards for a touchdown on the second play of the third quarter. The Bears had allowed 212 yards in the first half, but eventually allowed only 95 in the second half. Walter Payton had rushed for 120 yards on 17 carries, and McMahon completed 23/34 passes for 274 yards, two touchdowns and one interception.

Week 2: vs. Patriots

In the Super Bowl XX preview, the Bears defense was able to find their groove by forcing 4 turnovers on New England, and allowing them to only score a touchdown in the fourth quarter.

Week 3: at Vikings

The following week against rival Minnesota, backup quarterback Steve Fuller was called up to take the place of Jim McMahon, who was sidelined with a pinched nerve. With the Bears trailing the Vikings, an anxious McMahon was allowed to return to the game. Without any delay, McMahon famously spearheaded a Bears comeback and victory, with the game being nicknamed The Viking Miracle.

Week 4: vs. Redskins

Week 4 saw Chicago trailing 10-0 early to the Joe Theismann-led Washington Redskins. They would score the next forty-five points. One play turned the game, a 99-yard kickoff return by Willie Gault. This cut the lead to 10-7 and importantly, on the play, Washington's punter injured his knee and was sidelined for the remainder of the game. On the next possession, Theismann punted for 1 yard (his only punt in the NFL), and Chicago scored on the very next play to take a 14–10 lead, and they cruised from there.

Week 5: at Buccaneers

Week 6: at 49ers

Nine months after their humiliating defeat at the hands of the 49ers in the NFC Championship Game, the Bears claimed their revenge by sacking Joe Montana a then-career high seven times. In return for 49ers coach Bill Walsh’s idea of sending lineman Guy McIntyre in as fullback the season before, Mike Ditka sent in rookie William Perry, but as a runner rather than a blocker. Shortly after the game and the flight back to Chicago, Ditka was arrested for DWI.

This was the Bears’ last victory at Candlestick Park. and their last win at San Francisco until 2014 at Levi's Stadium.

Week 7: vs. Packers

The Bears defeated the Packers on Monday Night Football in a decisive 23–7 victory, with Perry becoming a folk hero after scoring his first career touchdown on a 1-yard run.

Week 8: vs. Vikings

Week 9: at Packers

The Packers increased tensions in the Bears-Packers rivalry after putting horse manure in the Bears locker room. However, the Bears had the last laugh against their hated rival, winning 16–10, and Perry scored his first career receiving touchdown along the way. Green Bay's Mark Lee and Ken Stills intensified the game after Lee sent Payton over a bench and Stills leveled Matt Suhey. With the Bears in trouble and trailing 10–7 in the 4th quarter, a Steve McMichael safety proved to be the key play that turned the game.  This cut the lead to 10-9 and the Bears got the ball at midfield following the safety free kick.  On the ensuing drive, Walter Payton sealed the victory with a 27-yard touchdown run, putting Chicago up for keeps 16–10.

Week 10: vs. Lions

The Bears defeated the Lions 24–3, while Walter Payton and Matt Suhey ran for 105 and 102 yards, respectively. As of February, 1, 2021, this was the last time the Bears had two 100-yard rushers in a game.

Week 11: at Cowboys

In a student vs teacher matchup, the Bears shut out the Cowboys, handing them the worst loss in franchise history, as well as the first time they were shut out in 15 years. The win also gave the Bears the NFC Central division title. Coach Ditka acknowledged feeling crushed when Coach Landry complimented his team after the game.

Week 12: vs. Falcons

In the coldest game of the season, the Bears recorded their second straight shutout, and third straight game without giving up a touchdown, against Atlanta, with defensive lineman Henry Waechter sacking Bob Holly in the endzone for a safety.

Week 13: at Dolphins

The Bears’ hopes for a perfect season were thwarted when Dan Marino and the Dolphins defeated the McMahon-less Bears on Monday Night Football, 38–24, and kept the '72 Dolphins the only undefeated regular season in league history (it wouldn't be until 2007 when the 2007 New England Patriots were able to tie this record).  Miami struck first when Marino hit Nat Moore for a 33-yard touchdown. Bears backup Steve Fuller then threw a 69-yard pass to Willie Gault, and eventually snuck in for a 1-yard touchdown. After a Fuad Reveiz field goal to put Miami up 10–7, Marino hit Moore again that set up a Ron Davenport touchdown to increase the gap by 10 points. After the Bears scored on a Kevin Butler field goal, Marino hit Mark Duper on a crossing pattern for 52 yards. On 3rd and 7, he connected with Mark Clayton for 26 yards down to the Bears 1-yard line. Davenport then ran in, and the Dolphins led 24–10. Later, the Dolphins would increase their lead to 31–10. The Bears had not allowed 31 points in one half since the 1972 season opener. The Bears then scored in the third quarter, but any momentum they gained was lost when Butler muffed the ensuing kickoff, which Dolphins rookie Alex Moyer recovered at the Bears 46. Dan Hampton then tipped a Marino pass into the air, but it sailed downfield for 30 yards before landing in the hands of Clayton, who went into the end zone to make it 38–17. Fuller hit Ken Margerum for a 19-yard touchdown, but that would be the last score of the night for the Bears. Mike Singletary said in America's Game: 1985 Chicago Bears:

The day after this loss, the Bears recorded "The Super Bowl Shuffle", a Grammy Award-nominated and Billboard charts #41 charting rap single that delivered over $300,000 to the Chicago Community Trust.

Week 14: vs. Colts

The 12-1 Bears hosted the 3-10 Colts and were 20-point favorites in Week 14. The Colts marched the ball 72 yards to the Chicago one-yard line on the first drive of the game. But on third and goal, Gary Fencik stuffed a pitch play for a five-yard loss and the Colts' kicker missed a 22-yard-field goal attempt wide left.  Both teams struggled to a 3-3 halftime score as Indianapolis actually outgained Chicago in the half.  Chicago finally pulled ahead on a 16-yard Walter Payton TD run near the end of the third quarter, and held on for a 17–10 victory.

Week 15: at Jets

Week 16: at Lions

The game featured a hit on Lions quarterback Joe Ferguson where he was knocked unconscious by Bears linebacker Wilber Marshall.

Standings

Staff

Roster

Playoffs

The Bears' defense dominated the game by allowing only 32 rushing yards and sacked Giants quarterback Phil Simms for 60 yards. Simms was 14/35 for 209 yards while running back Joe Morris, the NFL's regular-season touchdown leader, finished with 32 yards on 12 carries. Chicago's first touchdown resulted on a New York punt attempt from their own 12-yard line. The wind, blowing at 13 mph, caught the ball just enough for punter Sean Landeta to completely miss it, and Shaun Gayle picked it up and ran 5 yards for a touchdown. Bears quarterback Jim McMahon later threw two touchdown passes in the third quarter, both to Dennis McKinnon.  McMahon finished the game with 216 passing yards, while running back Walter Payton rushed for 94 yards.

At the start of the week leading up to the NFC Championship Game, Ditka commented on what he perceived as the NFL's unfavorable treatment of his team by famously stating, "I don't think we come in great favor with certain people. I think it's the same reason people look with disfavor on the Raiders. There are some teams that are fair-haired; there are some teams that are not fair-haired. There are teams named Smith; there are teams named Grabowski. The Rams are a Smith. We're a Grabowski."

The Bears defense dominated the game by limiting Rams running back Eric Dickerson to 46 yards, and holding quarterback Dieter Brock to 10 out of 31 completions for 66 passing yards.  Los Angeles only gained 130 yards of total offense. Chicago quarterback Jim McMahon scored on a 16-yard touchdown run in the first quarter, and later threw a 22-yard touchdown pass to Willie Gault in the third quarter. Kicker Kevin Butler kicked a 34-yard field goal in the first period. In the fourth quarter, defensive lineman Richard Dent forced Brock to fumble, and linebacker Wilber Marshall picked up the loose ball and returned it 52 yards for a touchdown.

Super Bowl

The Patriots took a quick lead after linebacker Larry McGrew recovered a fumble from Walter Payton at the Chicago 19-yard line on the second play of the game, setting up Tony Franklin's 36-yard field goal 1:19 into the first quarter. The Bears struck back with a 7-play, 59-yard drive, featuring a 43-yard pass completion from Jim McMahon to wide receiver Willie Gault, to set up a field goal from Kevin Butler, tying the score 3–3.

After both teams traded punts, Richard Dent and linebacker Wilber Marshall shared a sack on Eason, forcing a fumble that lineman Dan Hampton recovered on the Patriots 13-yard line.  Chicago then drove to the 3-yard line, but had to settle for another field goal from Butler after rookie defensive lineman William "Refrigerator" Perry was tackled for a 1-yard loss while trying to throw his first NFL pass on a halfback option play.  On the Patriots' ensuing drive, Dent forced running back Craig James to fumble, which was recovered by linebacker Mike Singletary at the 13-yard line.  Two plays later, Bears fullback Matt Suhey scored on an 11-yard touchdown run to increase the lead to 13–3.

New England took the ensuing kickoff and ran one play before the first quarter ended, which resulted in positive yardage for the first time in the game (a 3-yard run by James).  But after an incomplete pass and a 4-yard loss, they had to send in punter Rich Camarillo again, and receiver Keith Ortego returned the ball 12 yards to the 41-yard line.   The Bears subsequently drove 59 yards in 10 plays, featuring a 24-yard reception by Suhey, to score on McMahon's 2-yard touchdown run to increase their lead, 20–3.  After the ensuing kickoff, New England lost 13 yards in 3 plays and had to punt again, but got the ball back with great field position when defensive back Raymond Clayborn recovered a fumble from Suhey at their own 46-yard line.  Patriots coach Raymond Berry then replaced Eason with Steve Grogan to see if he could spark the Patriots offense. But Grogan could only lead them to the 37-yard line and they decided to punt rather than risk a 55-yard field goal attempt. The Bears then marched 72 yards in 11 plays, moving the ball inside the Patriots 10-yard line.  New England kept them out of the end zone, but Butler kicked his third field goal on the last play of the half to give Chicago a 23–3 halftime lead.

The Bears had absolutely dominated New England in the first half, holding them to 21 offensive plays (only 4 of which resulted in positive yardage),  −19 total offensive yards, 2 pass completions, 1 first down, and 3 points.  Meanwhile, Chicago gained 236 yards and scored 23 points themselves.

After the Patriots received the second half opening kickoff, they managed to get one first down, but then had to punt after Grogan was sacked twice. Camarillo, who punted 4 times in the first half, managed to pin the Bears back at their own 4-yard line with a Super Bowl record 62-yard punt. But the Patriots defense still had no ability to stop Chicago's offense. On their very first play, McMahon faked a handoff to Payton, then threw a 60-yard completion to Gault.  Eight plays later, McMahon finished the Super Bowl record 96-yard drive with a 1-yard touchdown run to make the Bears lead 30–3. On New England's second drive of the period, Chicago cornerback Reggie Phillips intercepted a pass from Grogan and returned it 28 yards for a touchdown to increase the lead to 37–3.

On the second play of their ensuing possession, the Patriots turned the ball over again, when receiver Cedric Jones lost a fumble after catching a 19-yard pass from Grogan.  A few plays later, McMahon's 27-yard completion to receiver Dennis Gentry moved the ball to the 1-yard line, setting up perhaps the most memorable moment of the game.  William "the Refrigerator" Perry was brought on to score on offense, as he had done twice in the regular season. His touchdown made the score 44–3.

The Patriots finally scored a touchdown early in the fourth quarter, advancing the ball 76 yards in 12 plays and scoring on an 8-yard pass from Grogan to receiver Irving Fryar. But the Bears defense dominated New England for the rest of the game, forcing another fumble, another interception, and defensive lineman Henry Waechter's sack on Grogan in the end zone for a safety to make the final score 46–10.

One oddity in the Bears victory was that Payton had a relatively poor performance statistically running the ball and never scored a touchdown in Super Bowl XX, his first and only Super Bowl appearance in a Hall of Fame career. However, if one views the game and watches the Patriots' defense, it is clear that their primary goal was stopping Payton and he frequently had three and four defenders keyed on him on nearly every play.  This allowed the rest of the Bears' offense far more opportunities to score than had the Patriots employed a more balanced defense.  Ultimately Payton was the Bears' leading rusher during the game, but the Patriots defense held him to only 61 yards on 22 carries, with his longest run being only 7 yards. He was given several opportunities to score near the goal line, but New England stopped him every time before he reached the end zone (such as his 2-yard loss from the New England 3-yard line a few plays before Butler's second field goal, and his 2-yard run from the 4-yard line right before McMahon's first rushing touchdown). Thus, Chicago head coach Mike Ditka opted to go for other plays to counter the Patriots defense. Perry's touchdown and McMahon's rushing touchdowns are widely considered as scoring opportunities that were denied to Payton.  Ditka has since gone on record stating that his biggest regret of his career was not creating a scoring opportunity for Payton during the game.

McMahon, who completed 12 out of 20 passes for 256 yards, became the first quarterback in a Super Bowl to score 2 rushing touchdowns.  Bears receiver Willie Gault finished the game with 129 receiving yards on just 4 receptions, an average of over 32.2 yards per catch.  He also returned 4 kickoffs for 49 yards.  Suhey had 11 carries for 52 yards and a touchdown, and caught a pass for 24 yards.  Singletary tied a Super Bowl record with 2 fumble recoveries.

Eason became the first Super Bowl starting quarterback to fail to complete a pass, going 0 for 6 attempts.  The Bears also dominated Patriots starting running back James, holding him to 1 yard on 5 carries, with 1 fumble. Grogan completed 17 out of 30 passes for 177 yards and 1 touchdown, with 2 interceptions.  Although Fullback Tony Collins was the Patriots leading rusher, he was limited to just 4 yards on 3 carries, and caught 2 passes for 19 yards.  New England receiver Stephen Starring returned 7 kickoffs for 153 yards and caught 2 passes for 39 yards.

Notable moments

Statistics
The Bears were first in scoring defense, allowing only 198 points in the regular season with an average of allowing only 12.4 points/game, as well as scoring more points than given up. The 198 points allowed were 65 less than the second-most allowed that year, while the point differential of plus-258 is 110 more than the second-ranked differential and the third-highest in NFL history. They were also second in scoring with 456 points (28.5 points/game), trailing only the Chargers that season. They also led the league in turnover differential at plus-23. The team also had 4 shutouts, two in the regular season over the Dallas Cowboys, and Atlanta Falcons, followed by the New York Giants and Los Angeles Rams in the postseason.

The defense
The Bears' iconic 46 defense (named after the jersey number of former Bears' safety, Doug Plank), led by mercurial defensive coordinator Buddy Ryan, was an "attack from all angles" scheme that resulted in, arguably, one of the greatest overall team defenses in league history. With future Hall of Famer Mike Singletary (#50) flanked by the supremely athletic Wilber Marshall (#58) and Otis Wilson (#55), the linebacking unit ranked in at #5 of the greatest linebacking corps in NFL history in NFL Top 10. Coupled with a solid backfield anchored by safeties Gary Fencik (FS) and Dave Duerson (22), and a defensive line that included future Hall of Famers Richard Dent (#95) and Dan "Danimal" Hampton (#99), along with the gritty Steve McMichael (#76) and breakout media superstar rookie, William "The Refrigerator" Perry (#72), the Bears were famous (or infamous) for getting to the quarterback early and often and completely disrupting their opponent's offensive game plans.

As a testament to their toughness, a hit by Marshall where he knocked Detroit Lions quarterback Joe Ferguson unconscious is still replayed as just one example of the ferocity with which this team played.

The irony of the defense's success was that two of the Bears' top defensive players, linebacker Al Harris and strong safety Todd Bell, missed the entire season due to contract disputes. Additionally, the team possessed several talented offensive players to back up their defense.

Chicago Honey Bears
The 1985 season was the team's cheerleading squad Chicago Honey Bears' final season with the team, as team owner Virginia Halas McCaskey eventually severed all ties with them.

The Super Bowl Shuffle

After the loss to the Miami Dolphins, most of the team recorded the song The Super Bowl Shuffle (defensive lineman Dan Hampton refused to participate due to the song's arrogance), becoming the first sports team to record a rap song (The 49ers recorded a post-disco song the year before). The song's popularity led to it being #41 on the US Billboard Hot 100, and the song funded $300,000 in profit for the Chicago Community Trust to help needy families in Chicago with clothing, shelter, and food, hence Walter Payton's rap lyric: "now we're not doing this because we're greedy, the Bears are doing it to feed the needy".

2011 White House visit

In 2011, the Bears made their visit to the White House, 25 years after their originally intended visit was cancelled due to the Space Shuttle Challenger disaster, as former President Barack Obama is a Bears fan. At that time, Obama called them the greatest team ever; however, he called his own words into question when hosting the 1972 Dolphins, the only NFL team with a perfect season. Obama noted that the only loss the 1985 Bears had was to the Dolphins.

Honors and achievements

Awards
NFL Champions (9)
National Football Conference Championship
NFC Central Division Championship
Richard Dent, Super Bowl XX Most Valuable Player
 Mike Ditka, 1985 AP NFL Coach of Year
 Mike Ditka, 1985 Sporting News NFL Coach of Year
 Mike Ditka, 1985 UPI NFL Coach of Year
 Walter Payton, Bert Bell Award
 Walter Payton, UPI NFC Player of the Year, Offense
 Mike Singletary, National Football League Defensive Player of the Year Award
 Mike Singletary, UPI NFC Player of the Year, Defense
 Mike Singletary, NFC Defensive Player of the Year

Hall of Famers
1988 Enshrinement Mike Ditka: 1961–1966 (player)
1993 Enshrinement Walter Payton: 1975–1987
1998 Enshrinement Mike Singletary: 1981–1992
2002 Enshrinement Dan Hampton: 1979–1990
2011 Enshrinement Richard Dent: 1983–1993, 1995
2020 Enshrinement Jim Covert: 1983-1991

Players that became coaches
 Mike Singletary, Head Coach of the San Francisco 49ers (2008–2010); Minnesota Vikings (2011–2013; assistant head coach/linebackers coach)
 Leslie Frazier, Head Coach of the Minnesota Vikings (2010–2013)
 Ron Rivera, Defensive Coordinator of the Bears (2004–2006); Head Coach of the Carolina Panthers (2011–2019); Head Coach of the Washington Football Team (2019–present)
 Brian Cabral, Interim Head Coach of the Colorado Buffaloes (2010)
 Steve McMichael, Head Coach Chicago Slaughter, CIFL  (2007–2013)
 Dennis Gentry, Running Backs Coach Chicago Enforcers, XFL  (2001)
 Jeff Fisher, Head Coach of the Tennessee Titans (1994–2010); St. Louis/Los Angeles Rams (2012–2016)

Notes
Kazor also served as the team's special teams coach, defensive assistant, and tight ends coach

References

Further reading

 
Total Football: The Official Encyclopedia of the National Football League
The Sporting News Complete Super Bowl Book 1995

External links

 1985 Chicago Bears season at ESPN.com
 1985 Chicago Bears season  Pro Football Reference
 1985 Chicago Bears Season at www.bearshistory.com

Chicago Bears seasons
Chicago Bears
NFC Central championship seasons
National Football Conference championship seasons
Super Bowl champion seasons
Chicago